Yadavalli is a Telaganya Brahmin surname used in Telangana and Andhra Pradesh. The variants of this surname include 'Yadavilli', 'Yedavalli' and similar. Sets of Yadavilli have settled in other cities including Bhimavaram, Rajahmundry, Berhampur, Srikakulam, Visakhapatnam, and Hyderabad. The geographic origin of this surname and the clan can be traced to Telangana's Medak-Basar region on the banks of Godavari river. They are supposed to have been forced out from this area by the Moghuls and ended up sailing along the Godavari river culminating in Bhimavaram. From there on, parts of the clan drifted along the land northwards towards Visakhapatnam, Srikakulam and Berhampur. They worship Lord Venkata Ramana as their deity.

They belong Atreya (Atreyasa) Gotra and belong to the pravara - Atreyasa, Aarchanaasa, Syaavaasva.